Landsat 6, equipped with upgraded versions of the instruments on Landsat 5, was designed to carry forward the Landsat program. It was launched on October 5, 1993, with a Titan II launch vehicle, but failed to reach orbit. Landsat 6 omitted the Multi-Spectral Scanner found on its predecessors, but carried an Enhanced Thematic Mapper, which improved on the previous Thematic Mapper by adding a 15m-resolution panchromatic band.

Development

The Landsat 6 satellite was built by Martin Marietta Astro Space.

Design

Operations
The satellite was constructed from aluminum and used graphite struts. Landsat 6 had a hydrazine propulsion system. The spacecraft was powered by one solar array that had single-axis articulation and produced 1430 W. The power was stored in two NiCd batteries that had a capacity of 100 Ah. Data collected from the sensors was stored on tapes and transmitted to ground stations at 85 Mbit/s. The satellite was stabilized to 0.1 degrees in all three axes by using reaction wheels.

Sensors
The Enhanced Thematic Mapper was designed and manufactured by Santa Barbara Research Center.

Mission

Launch
Landsat 6 was launched aboard a Titan II launch vehicle from Vandenberg Air Force Base on October 5, 1993.

Operations
Landsat 6 separated from the Titan II launch vehicle as programmed, but an explosion in its liquid fuel system upon separation doomed the satellite. Martin Marietta and NOAA both convened review boards to investigate the failure. Both boards determined that Landsat 6 did not achieve orbit due to a ruptured hydrazine manifold, and recommended a task force to investigate hydrazine feed systems that were considered "safe and failure-free".

References

Satellite launch failures
Spacecraft launched in 1993
Landsat program
Spacecraft launched by Titan rockets